Nikhil Dwivedi is an Indian actor and producer who works in Hindi cinema. He is best known for his role in television series Scam 1992 (2020). His other acting roles include My Name Is Anthony Gonsalves (2008), Raavan (2010), Shor in the City (2011), Ankahi Kahaniya (2021). As a producer, he has produced films like Veere Di Wedding (2018) and Dabangg 3 (2019).

Early life
Nikhil Dwivedi was born in a middle-class family in Kanpur. He worked for American Express Bank and  before moving on to work for a consumer electronics shop. However, he gave up all of this to pursue acting in films.

Career
His first major role was as the title role in My Name Is Anthony Gonsalves in 2008, which was directed by E. Niwas and co-produced by Shahrukh Khan's Red Chillies production house. He went on to secure the role of Lakshman in Mani Ratnam's Raavan that also starred Abhishek Bachchan and Aishwarya Rai Bachchan. His third film was Shor in the City, where he played the role of Ramesh alongside Tusshar Kapoor in the Balaji Telefilms production. Dwivedi's fourth venture "Hate Story" directed by Vivek Agnihotri has been hailed as a flop. His fifth film wasTamanchey in which he co-starred with Richa Chadha.

In 2018, he co produced his first film Veere Di Wedding with Ekta Kapoor, Anil Kapoor, Rhea Kapoor and Shobha Kapoor. It was followed by Dabangg 3 (2019) which was co produced by Salman Khan. In 2019, he also produced television serial named Shrimad Bhagwat Mahapuran on Colors TV, which stars Rajneesh Duggal and Shiny Doshi in lead.

In 2020, he made his comeback as an actor after a six-year hiatus, he appeared in Sony LIV original series Scam 1992 directed by Hansal Mehta.

Personal life

Dwivedi married model and actress Gaurie Pandit in early 2011 at a small ceremony. The couple has a son, Shivaan.

Filmography

Film

Television

Awards

References

External links

1978 births
Living people
21st-century Indian male actors
Male actors in Hindi cinema
Male actors from Allahabad